Madeline Lee may refer to:

Madeline Lee (actress) (1923–2008), American performer, producer and social activist; married to Jack Gilford
Madeleine Lee (Neighbours), a character appearing from April 2004 to January 2005
Madeline Lee (opera), a 2004 one-act opera by Australian composer John Haddock
Madeleine Lee (writer) (born 1962), Singaporean poet and investment manager

See also
 Madeline (disambiguation)